The Ultraforce is a fictional superhero group that appears in American comic books published by Malibu, and later Marvel. The purpose of the group was to protect the public and keep other "Ultras" (superheroes) from becoming unruly. The group consists of various Ultras in Malibu's Ultraverse, including the super-strong Prime; Hardcase, one of the first public Ultras and the most famous; Prototype, Ultra-Tech's armored spokesperson; Topaz, warrior queen of Gwendor; the undead Ghoul, the last surviving member of the Exiles; and the mysterious Contrary, who organized the team and provided their technology.

In 1994, Ultraforce was adapted into an animated television series that ran for 13 episodes. The series was produced by DIC.

Publication history
The team debuted in Ultraforce #0 (Sept. 1994). In a similar fashion to the Avengers and Justice League, Ultraforce was an assemblage of ultras (superheroes) who each had an existing series of their own. The first Ultraforce series ran for 11 issues, from #0-10. The first 7 issues were written by Gerard Jones and drawn by George Perez.

After the purchase of Malibu Comics by Marvel, Ultraforce began a crossover with the Avengers in the Black September event with Avengers/Ultraforce. After the event, the Ultraforce book was reformed and ran for 16 issues (September 1995-December 1996), from issue ∞ to issue 15, until the end of the Ultraverse imprint.

The Ultra's team were also depicted in a multitude of events such as Black September, Phoenix Resurrection, Ultraforce/Spider-Man, and Ultraverse Unlimited.

Fictional biography

Formation of the team
The only survivor of the Exiles, Ghoul, raised himself from his tomb and was harassed by the press and the public. The Ultra Hardcase rescued him and suggested to the press that only the Ultras could regulate other Ultras, not the government. Prime saw the interview on TV and decided to search for members of a new team to be called "Ultraforce". He convinced Prototype of the necessity of the team, but begin to fight him for the "leadership". The fight between the two young ultras alerted Contrary, who brought Hardcase and Ghoul to her airship and show them the impact that the fight was having on the general public. When Prime and Prototype were fighting in the land, The villain Atalon, king of the fire people, brought them underground. Hardcase went to rescue them. Meanwhile, one of the three queens of Gwendor, Topaz, arrived on Earth from the Godwheel. Contrary promised her to return to her people. Prime and Prototype tried to fight Atalon but were defeated by him. Hardcase arrives just in time save them. After this, the team was formed and backed by the US government and president Bill Clinton. The members tried to recruit aid from the Freex, The Strangers, the Nightman, and Mantra, but were rejected. After manipulations of Contrary, Prime left the team temporarily. Attalon raised a new island and fought Ultraforce in the surface. In the fight, Prime returned and Atalon detonated a nuclear missile in the isle.

In the battle with Attalon, the young ultra Pixx sacrificed herself to disable the nuclear arsenal of the villain and was killed by the increasing radiation. In the end, Attalon was defeated and after a negotiation with Contrary, he left the surface world to its own devices. In the next months, the Ultra Ghoul investigated the strange death of the singer Mosh.

Black September
Marvel's superhero Black Knight arrived in the Ultraverse and met with Prototype and Prime. He participated in the battle against some 'angels' created by Metabio Corporation and that was freed accidentally by the ultra Siren, who joined the team too. The 'angels' did not have an effect on Ghoul, because he had a decaying body, so he could defeat them.  Topaz fought the sorceress Mantra for the possession of the sword of Fangs that used to belong to Topaz's people, but were interrupted by the villain Hybrid who sent Ultraforce in a quest in Egypt. Hybrid was killed and Topaz and Mantra make peace Later, when Black Knight was searching for clues about Loki's presence in New York, he found his lover Sersi, but she was possessed by the Ego Infinity gem and attacked him and Topaz.

Then, the Ultraforce battled the Asgardian God Loki that was searching for the Infinity Gems in the Ultraverse. Loki sends the heroes in different directions with illusions. They found the infinity gems and with the help of Sersi, returned to Earth. After this, the Ultraforce heroes were fooled by Loki in fighting the Avengers in a competition between Loki and the Grandmaster for the Infinity Gems. Loki won the competition and received all the gems, but he soon lost the gems to the entity Nemesis when the seven gems reunited. Both teams (Avengers and Ultraforce) fought Nemesis in an altered reality that combined both universes. The slaying of Nemesis by the Black Knight caused a reality-changed event that transformed the Ultraverse, erasing Hardcase and Contrary from existence and from the memories of their former teammates, and replacing Prototype (Jimmy Ruiz) with his predecessor in the Prototype armor, Bob Campbell.

After Black September
After the event known as "Black September" (when Marvel Comics purchased Malibu), the Ultraforce was re-created as a new team. Marvel's Black Knight became the leader of the new group, which consisted of him, Prototype (Bob Campbell), Prime, Topaz, and Ghoul. The new team fought the fanatics of the Fold  that worshiped a man called Pascal and were murdering ultras. However, they found that Pascal was dead and that the Fold was using him to enforce their beliefs. The team was given a new base by the U.S. government in Headless Cross, Arkansas. A mysterious man called Cromwell was introduced as a government liaison for the team, and the wife of Bob Campbell, Felicia Campbell, supported the team as a medic. In the next months, new members arrived in the team included the mysterious Lament and the vigilante Wreckage, who apparently had committed various murders that were investigated by Ultraforce. They discovered that the murders were committed by the ultra Bonnehammer, who was employed by a criminal organization, the commission. With the help of Wreckage, the Ultraforce defeated Bonehammer.

The team-up with the X-Men occurred when the Phoenix Force arrived in the Ultraverse and possessed Prime. Both teams drove the Phoenix away, but it found a new host: Amber Hunt. They also team up with Spider-Man against the extraterrestrials The Shifters who attempted to provoke a war between the Ultraverse and Earth 616. Afterwards, Amber Hunt and Ghoul investigated the Exiles' graves and found the Progeny, an alien menace from the future. In an investigation about the ultra Foxfire, Ultraforce met Timothy Halloran, the Mastodon, who was committing murders in the sewers of New York. Mastodon was taken to medical care. Foxfire was an unknown carrier of the Progeny virus.

The Ultraforce investigated the murder of Senator Robert Shrine, which involved ultras who were killed too. In the quest, they fought the Rawborgs and Dog. After the murderous attack of some of his teammates against Dog, the Black Knight expelled Topaz, Ghoul, Lament and Wreckage from the team. Topaz did not want to leave and confronted the Knight. She, Lament and Prime were acting very aggressively and attacked the Knight and Cromwell. It was revealed that Prime, Lament, and Topaz were infected by the Progeny virus and fought his counterparts from 50 years in the future that came to cure them. The Progeny virus would have infected all the Ultras in Earth. After they cured the virus and took Foxfire with them, the Ultraforce from the future erased the memory of this event from their counterparts of the past. Searching in the base about what happened, the Black Knight and Topaz released Specimen 13, one of several beings being kept in the secret basement and who was also Cromwell's brother. The specimen overpowered the heroes but was convinced by his brother to return to his chamber.

After this, the Ultraforce joined the New Exiles, who were fighting an alien robot called Maxis. The Ultraforce collapsed a building upon Maxis, stopping him temporarily. Immediately afterward, an entire armada of the Tulkan aliens arrived at the scene. They said that they were tracking a monster called Demonseed who was causing various damage to their worlds. The Tulkan had tracked the monster to Earth and wanted revenge. The Ultraforce and the New Exiles fought the elite of the armada, defeating them after a brutal battle. With problems in their ships, the Tulkan leader accepted defeat and fled. In the aftermath of the invasion, and with the help of Maxis, the Black Knight returned to his home dimension with the exiles Siena Blaze and Reaper via an interdimensional portal.

Prototype (Bob Campbell) becomes the new leader and accepted new members from the Exiles: Hellblade, Ripfire, Amber Hunt, Ironclad, and the robot Maxis, who was now deprived of his original mission. When Ghoul arrived at the scene, he was accepted back into the team as well. Back at their base, the Ultraforce met Hardcase, but did not recognize him. Hardcase explained to them he was not erased by the Black September, but was shunted instead into a limbo, where he created the creature Demonseed as a companion in the loneliness. However, Demonseed rebelled against his creator and escaped to the past via a portal, where he destroyed innumerable alien civilizations. Demonseed finally appeared and fought the Ultraforce, overpowering them, Ripfire was killed in the last attacks of the creature, but Hardcase sacrificed himself to send Demonseed back to the limbo, where he fought it for all eternity. Despite the grave losses, the Ultraforce looked into the future to continue its mission.

50 years into the future, Prime, Ironclad, and others were having a happy time after various battles.

Members
The names listed are those used while the character was associated with Ultraforce. "First appearance" is the place where the character first appeared in the Ultraverse. It is not necessarily the first appearance of the character in print, nor the story depicting how the character joined the team. All information is listed in publication order first, then alphabetical.

Pre-Black September

Post-Black September

Short resume

Hardcase
Hardcase is a superhero that debuted in the comic book series of the same name, written by James Hudnall for Malibu Comics’ Ultraverse imprint, being one of the first series to launch the imprint.[1][2] Hardcase was Tom Hawke, a Hollywood actor who became one of the first publicly known Ultras (the blanket term for superhumans in the Ultraverse) formed the first superhero team in his universe, The Squad.

Hardcase made his first appearance in Hardcase #1, dated June 1993, written by James Hudnall and illustrated by Jim Callahan.

As part of the Ultraverse imprint, the comic was set within a shared universe of super-powered beings conceptualized by creators of Malibu comics. Image Comics, a line of creator-owned comics that had record-breaking sales figures, had a publishing deal with Malibu that had ended shortly before. The book lasted 26 issues and included a Hardcase Premiere edition published in July 1993. Hardcase also appeared in other books, and crossovers like Break-thru, Godwheel and Black September. He was included in the first volume of the Ultraforce team book as part of the lineup. After the Black September event, Hardcase was apparently removed from existence, but he returned in Ultraforce Vol.2 #13 and took part of the final arc of the book.

Incredibly strong, Hardcase is able to throw a car over 50 yards with little effort. His leg muscles allow him to leap nearly a mile. Nearly invulnerable to damage and changes in temperature, only extreme temperatures affect him. When he is hurt, Hardcase can heal quickly, though the process is sped up if he drinks seawater. His senses are enhanced, allowing him to hear and see over long distances.

Prototype
Prototype is the name of two fictitious superheroes of the Ultraverse line of comics. Both characters used an advanced exo-armor developed by the Ultratech corporation and were employees of that company. The original Prototype was Bob Campbell, who was replaced after an accident by a young man called Jimmy Ruiz.

Bob Campbell served as the first spokesperson for Ultratech corporation. He used the Prototype armor developed by the company but he was injured in a demonstration and lost an arm after fighting the villain, Arena.

After the accident, the young man Jimmy Ruiz was contracted by Ultratech to serve as the new spokesperson. He was given steroids and was surgically implanted with special cybernetics to allow him to control a new Prototype armor in a controlled manner. In his first apparition to the shareholders meeting, Jimmy was attacked by a supervillain. The fight ended with the killing of the villain.

Jimmy with Bob, after uncovering Ultra-Tech's corruption, opted to overthrow the company and become independent heroes, fighting the Japanese organization, Techuza.

When Marvel relaunched the Ultraverse, in the Black September (comics)  event,  Jimmy Ruiz was erased out of existence and Bob Campbell was the only Prototype that had existed (his arm had never been torn off, either). He became part of the new Ultraforce and after a time, his leader. He led the Ultraforce heroes against the villain, Demonseed.

Contrary
Contrary is a mysterious woman who discovered the technology of the ancient Fire People, building a secret academy for young ultras and a special airship with transportation abilities. She was alleged Wetware Mary, a nurse who exposed various infant children to a wetware virus, transforming them into Ultras in their puberty. Years later, Contrary tracked down several of these children for her Academy of the New Elite and was opposed by the runaways teens called Freex. When Ultraforce was formed, Contrary united the various members and convinced Hardcase to be the leader. She expressed interest in the adventures of the Black Knight, when he arrived in the Ultraverse, from Earth-616.

When Marvel relaunched the Ultraverse, in the Black September (comics)  event,  Contrary was erased out of existence, and her  whereabouts are unknown

Topaz
Topaz is a character created by  Mike W. Barr, appearing first in  Giant-Size Mantra #1.
She was a warrior Queen from the extra-dimensional matriarchal realm of Gwendor, located in the Godwheel. Topaz was the title of the queen, and her real name was never revealed. She meets the sorceress Mantra, when she arrived in her kingdom. She fought the sorceress for the possession of the old Gwendor's Claw, an ancient relic.

A crashed alien spacecraft created a series of random pan-dimensional gateways, briefly connecting Gwendor to the Ultraverse, transporting Queen Topaz stranded in a strange world; one in which Males were not separate from women like Gwendor. Topaz was outraged by the new reality, but Pixx of the Ultraforce calmed her by showing her an image of the "true power behind men". Hillary Clinton (then First lady of the USA). Pixx explained that Earth males have fragile egos and that it was easier for women to let males think they were in charge. Topaz, still disturbed for what she considered an unnatural order, consented to join UltraForce, even though it was led by a man, Hardcase.
After the Black knight arrived in the ultraverse, Topaz begin to discuss with him his mandates. When Sersi arrived at the encounter of the Knight, apparently mad, Topaz begins a battle with the Eternal, until Sersi was calmed. After Black September, Topaz remained in the Ultraverse and get used to it. There were hints of mutual attraction between her and Black Knight, that went nowhere. Topaz was in the front in the battle against the Tulkans and Demonseed.

Ghoul
Ghoul (real name Jonathan Martin) is a character created by  Steve Gerber, R.R. Phipps, Dave Olbrich, Chris Ulm, and Tom Mason, appearing first in  Exiles Vol.1 #1.
Jonathan Martin was one of the young people affected by the Theta Virus, which provided superhuman powers but also killed its host without assistance. He became a zombie-like being, neither truly alive nor dead. He was recruited in the Exiles by Dr. Rachel Deming, who united a group of Theta Virus victims with superpowers. The entire group was killed (after various mistakes) by an explosion caused by Amber Hunt. Before his "death", Ghoul killed the villain Malcolm Kord and his minions.
Ghoul survived, being buried for a while, and rose from his grave with an altered appearance, meeting Hardcase and became a member of the Ultraforce.

Pixx
Pixx  (Penny Burka) is a character created by Gerard Jones and Jeff Parker. Her first appearance was in Giant Size Freex #1(1995). 
Penny was a normal teen until her powers surfaced, causing her to uncontrollably project hallucinatory images to those around her. Her parents contacted the Academy of the New Elite, managed by Contrary. Under her tutelage, Pixx discovered that t her powers also extended to enormous technical prowess. She was part of the original lineup of Ultraforce, but she sacrificed herself in the battle against Attalon.

Enemies

Pre-Black September

 Attalon
 Angels created by Metabio corporation
 Hybrid
 Loki
 Nemesis

Post-Black September

 The Fold and Pascal
 Bonehammer
 Phoenix Force
 Shifters
 The Progeny 
 Rawborgs and Dog
 Specimen 13
 Maxis
 Tulkan armada and his Elite
 Demonseed
 Rune

Possibility of revival
In 2003, Steve Englehart was commissioned by Marvel to relaunch the Ultraverse with the most recognizable characters, including Hardcase and Prime, but the editorial decided finally not to resurrect the imprint. In June 2005, when asked by Newsarama whether Marvel had any plans to revive the Ultraverse, Marvel editor-in-chief Joe Quesada replied that:

When Simon Spurrier, writer of the 2021 Black Knight series, was asked if the series was going to take place in the Ultraverse, he said: "None percent, I'm afraid."

Animated series

There was a short-lived Ultraforce animated television series that ran for 13 episodes. It was based on the first version of the Ultraforce comic book, and was produced by DIC Productions, L.P. and Bohbot Entertainment. There was also an Ultraforce action figure line produced by Galoob. The cartoon featured the roster of Prime, Hardcase, Prototype, Topaz, Ghoul, Contrary and Pixx. It also included appearances of the Night Man and the Strangers.

Episode list

Voice cast

Reception
The TV show had a poor reception from critics.

In other media
 The Ultraforce character Topaz (created by Mike W. Barr) was portrayed by Rachel House, in the film Thor: Ragnarok (2017) and in the short film Team Darryl, as part of the Marvel Cinematic Universe, produced by Marvel Studios.

References

External links
Unofficial Profile at Marvunapp.com
Unofficial Profile of Contrary at Marvunapp.com
Unofficial Profile of Topaz at Marvunapp.com
Unofficial Profile of Ghoul at Marvunapp.com
Ultraforce Action Figure Guide

Ultraforce at the Marvel Database Project
, about the movie adaptation of the character Topaz.

1990s American animated television series
1990s Canadian animated television series
1995 American television series debuts
1995 American television series endings
1995 Canadian television series debuts
1995 Canadian television series endings
American children's animated action television series
American children's animated science fiction television series
American children's animated superhero television series
Animated television series based on Marvel Comics
Canadian children's animated action television series
Canadian children's animated science fiction television series
Canadian children's animated superhero television series
Comics characters introduced in 1994
First-run syndicated television programs in the United States
Marvel Comics superhero teams
Malibu Comics titles
Television series by DIC Entertainment
Ultraverse
USA Action Extreme Team